Guillaume René Gigliotti (born 9 November 1989) is a French footballer who plays as a left back for Italian  club Crotone.

Career
Born in Istres, Gigliotti finished his formation with Monaco, making his senior debuts with the reserve team in the 2007–08 season. In July 2010, he moved to Italy, signing with Novara. After appearing sparingly with the club, he was loaned to Foggia in August 2011.

After being a regular with Foggia (contributing with 31 appearances and 2 goals), Gigliotti signed with Empoli, with Flavio Lazzari moved to opposite direction. However, he only appeared once with Empoli, playing the last minutes in a 3–1 home win over Varese.

On 3 September 2013 Gigliotti moved to Spain, signing a contract with Badalona on free transfer.

On 2 February 2014 he was signed by Foggia Calcio.

On 16 July 2018 he joined Serie B club Salernitana, signing a 3-year contract.

On 31 July 2019, he signed a 2-year contract with Serie B club Crotone. 

On 5 October 2020 he moved to Chievo on a two-year contract.

On 19 January 2023, Gigliotti returned to Crotone and signed a contract until June 2024.

Personal life
Guillaume's brother, David Gigliotti, is also a professional footballer. He is of Argentine descent through his father.

Honours
Bari
 Serie C: 2021–22 (Group C)

References

External links

1989 births
Living people
People from Istres
Sportspeople from Bouches-du-Rhône
French people of Argentine descent
Sportspeople of Argentine descent
French footballers
Association football defenders
Championnat National players
Championnat National 2 players
AS Monaco FC players
Serie B players
Serie C players
Novara F.C. players
Calcio Foggia 1920 players
Empoli F.C. players
Ascoli Calcio 1898 F.C. players
U.S. Salernitana 1919 players
F.C. Crotone players
A.C. ChievoVerona players
S.S.C. Bari players
Segunda División B players
CF Badalona players
French expatriate footballers
Expatriate footballers in Spain
French expatriate sportspeople in Spain
Expatriate footballers in Italy
French expatriate sportspeople in Italy
Footballers from Provence-Alpes-Côte d'Azur